

Events
June - D'banj secretly marries Lineo Didi Kilgrow.
September - Tsar Leo, "Malawi's Drake", is nominated in the 15th for his single, "The Other Side". 
October - A Man of Good Hope, a musical by Isango Ensemble based on a book by Jonny Steinberg, is performed at the Young Vic in London, UK.
November - King Sunny Adé receives the AFRIMA award. 
December - King Sunny Adé is inducted into Hard Rock Cafe hall of fame.

Albums
Burna Boy — Redemption
Louise Carver - Hanging in the Void
Kiss Daniel — New Era
Adekunle Gold — Gold
Ladysmith Black Mambazo — Walking in the Footsteps of Our Fathers
Ike Moriz - Debonaire
 Myrath - Legacy
Ahmed Soultan - Music Has No Boundaries

Classical
Alfred P. Addaquay - Laudatur Christus

Musical films

Deaths
April 24 – Papa Wemba, Congolese singer and musician, 66
June 22 – Harry Rabinowitz, South African-born British conductor and composer, 100
September 8 – Johan Botha, South African tenor, 51
October 10 – Issa Bagayogo, Malian musician, 54
November 9 – Nico Carstens, South African accordionist and songwriter, 90

See also 
 2016 in music

References 

Africa
African music
 Music